Kiyasovo is the name of two rural localities in Russia:
Kiyasovo, Moscow Oblast, a selo in Stupinsky District of Moscow Oblast
Kiyasovo, Udmurt Republic, a selo in Kiyasovsky District of the Udmurt Republic